Sprint Expressway  (Malay: Sistem Penyuraian Trafik KL Barat, Western KL Traffic Dispersial System or Lebuhraya Sprint) is the main expressway network in Klang Valley, Malaysia. The  of expressway is divided into three sections: the Kerinchi Link, Damansara Link and Penchala Link. It is a three-lane dual carriageway that was built to disperse traffic from congested inner city roads and narrow residential roads leading into the city of Kuala Lumpur from the Western suburbs of Petaling Jaya and Damansara and surrounding areas. This expressway is also known as Western Dispersal Link Scheme. It is one of the busiest expressway during rush hour from/to Kuala Lumpur.

Route background

Kerinchi Link
The  sections from Seputeh Interchange at Federal Highway to NKVE at Jalan Duta. The Kilometre Zero of the Kerinchi Link's section is located at Mont Kiara-NKVE Interchange.

Damansara Link
The  sections from Kayu Ara to Jalan Duta-Semantan Interchange. The Kilometre Zero of the Damansara Link's section is located at Kampung Kayu Ara in Petaling Jaya, Selangor.

Penchala Link
The  sections from Damansara–Puchong Expressway at Penchala, Penchala Tunnel to Mont Kiara. The Kilometre Zero of the Penchala Link's section is located at Mont Kiara Interchange

History
The proposal to build the expressway began in 1997 while the massive traffic jams on Jalan Damansara were a main motivation to build it. The concession for the expressway was awarded to Sistem Penyuraian Trafik KL Barat Sdn Bhd (Sprint). On 23 October 1997, the concession agreement was signed between the Government of Malaysia and Sprint for the privatization of the improvement, upgrading, design, construction, maintenance, operations and management of Sprint Expressway. A Supplementary Agreement was subsequently signed on 4 September 1998 to defer the construction of the Penchala Link. The Concession Period is for 33 years and commenced on the effective date on 15 December 1998. After this period, the toll collection will cease and the highways will be handed over to the government.

The construction began in 1999. The expressway includes the acquisition and upgrades of several major roads such as Jalan Damansara, Jalan Kayu Ara, Jalan Sri Hartamas, and Jalan Semantan. The Kerinchi Link and Damansara Link were opened in 2001, followed by the Penchala Link in 2004.

This expressway also featured its own toll collection system known as the "FasTrak". On 1 July 2004, the FasTrak electronic payment system was replaced by Touch 'n Go and Smart TAG electronic payment systems.

Pioneer roads
The construction of the Sprint Expressway includes the acquisition and upgrades of several major roads as follows:

Kerinchi Link

Damansara Link

Features

The expressway has several notable features:

Kerinchi Link, the first double deck carriageway in Malaysia.
Penchala Tunnel, the widest road tunnel in Malaysia.
The former Damansara Town Centre on Damansara Link as the "island" of separated carriageway.
The 3 km toll-free road at Damansara Link as an alternative to residents who live in Sections 16 and 17 of Petaling Jaya
The Speed Indicator Display (SID) at Kerinchi Link.
The elevated Sungai Buloh–Kajang MRT line from Taman Tun Dr Ismail to Jalan Duta

Controversies and criticisms

Kerinchi Link at the Universiti Malaya site
The double-deck carriageway design of Kerinchi Link from Bukit Kiara Interchange Exit 2310 to Kerinchi Interchange Exit 2310 was made as a result of the early controversial issues during the development stage. The construction of the stretch took place at the border of Universiti Malaya, which meant that the construction could take up some of the university area, which sparked complaints. As a result, the expressway concessionaire Sprint came up with the idea of a double-deck carriageway which could reduce the land usage.

Damansara Town Centre as the "island" of separated carriageway
During the construction of the expressway, Jalan Semantan could not be widened to 6-lane expressway, therefore the highway concessionaire took another main road at Damansara Town Centre for the Eastbound route such as Jalan Johar and Jalan Beringin. As a result, Damansara Town Centre became as the "island" of the separated carriageways.

Unopened 2-lane off-ramp to Penchala Link at Sri Hartamas

Disputed ramp
When the expressway was opened to the traffic, the 530 m-long two-lane off-ramp from the Northbound direction of Kerinchi Link to Penchala Link at the Mont Kiara Interchange Exit 2303 could not be opened to traffic as a result of a land owner fencing the land which became a part of the ramp. The land owner's action has created difficulties among the residents of Bukit Kiara and Sri Hartamas, and even the highway concessionaire itself.

Meanwhile, the highway concessionaire has made a narrower temporary ramp to Penchala Link but according to the highway concessionaire, the temporary ramp is quite unsafe due to risks of being collided from behind. For the time being, the highway concessionaire is still negotiating with the land owner in order to open the two-lane ramp.

Opening the ramp
At 3pm, 3 June 2010, Works Minister Datuk Shaziman Abu Mansor officially opened this disputed ramp.

Hitherto, road users living in the Mont Kiara and Sri Hartamas areas wanting to go to Jalan Duta, Duta–Ulu Klang Expressway (DUKE) and Penchala Link only had two lanes to use.

"This new ramp will ease the movement of almost 22,000 vehicles per day", he told reporters after opening the ramp.

Shaziman said the 50-metre ramp, which was delayed for seven years owing to problems related to acquisition of land, was completed in five months after the intervention by the Malaysian Prime Minister, Datuk Seri Najib Tun Razak, who had immediately approved about RM20 million for the acquisition of land.

The old SJKC Damansara near Sprint Expressway
The old SJKC Damansara has one block located at Section 17 near Jalan Damansara (now Sprint Expressway). However, on 26 January 2001, the school was moved from old block at Section 17 to the new smart school at PJU 3, near Tropicana Golf and Country Club following the instructions from federal government that it no longer provided a "conducive learning environment" because of traffic congestion and noise pollution from the neighbouring Sprint Expressway.

Tolls
The Sprint Expressway uses open toll systems.

Electronic Toll Collections (ETC)
As part of an initiative to facilitate faster transactions at the Kerinchi Link, Damansara Link and Penchala Link Toll Plazas, all toll transactions at three stretches toll plazas on the Sprint Expressway have been conducted electronically via Touch 'n Go cards or SmartTAGs since 2 March 2016.

Toll rates
(As of 15 October 2015)

Kerinchi Link

Damansara Link (NKVE and TTDI bound only)

Penchala Link

List of interchanges

Kerinchi Link (north–south)

Damansara Link (east–west)

Penchala Link (west–east)

References

External links
 Gamuda Group
 SPRINT
 Mont

2001 establishments in Malaysia
Expressways in Malaysia
Expressways and highways in the Klang Valley